The House of Schleswig-Holstein-Sonderburg-Beck (Schleswig-Holstein-Beck or Beck for short) was a line of the Schleswig-Holstein-Sonderburg branch of the House of Oldenburg. It consisted of August Philipp, Duke of Schleswig-Holstein-Sonderburg-Beck (1612–1675) and his male-line descendants. Schleswig-Holstein-Glücksburg, to which several present-day royal houses belong, is a branch of Schleswig-Holstein-Beck.

The members of the line were titular dukes of Schleswig and Holstein, and they were originally not ruling. The line is named after Beck, a manor in Ulenburg, Bishopric of Minden (today Löhne, North Rhine Westphalia). August Philipp bought this manor from the Count of Oldenburg, and he made it his residence.

Family tree of the Dukes of Schleswig-Holstein-Sonderburg-Beck (tenure as duke is shown in brackets):

 August Philipp, Duke of Schleswig-Holstein-Sonderburg-Beck (1627–75),
August, Duke of Schleswig-Holstein-Sonderburg-Beck (1675–89),
 Frederick William I, Duke of Schleswig-Holstein-Sonderburg-Beck (1689–1719),
 Frederick Louis, Duke of Schleswig-Holstein-Sonderburg-Beck (1719–28),
Frederick William II, Duke of Schleswig-Holstein-Sonderburg-Beck (1728–49),
 Frederick William III, Duke of Schleswig-Holstein-Sonderburg-Beck (1749–57),
 Charles Louis, Duke of Schleswig-Holstein-Sonderburg-Beck (1757–74), 
 Peter August, Duke of Schleswig-Holstein-Sonderburg-Beck (1774–75),
Prince Karl Anton August of Schleswig-Holstein-Sonderburg-Beck,
Friedrich Karl Ludwig, Duke of Schleswig-Holstein-Sonderburg-Beck (1775–1816),
 Friedrich Wilhelm, Duke of Schleswig-Holstein-Sonderburg-Glücksburg (1816–25), founder of the Schleswig-Holstein-Glücksburg line in 1825.

 
 
1627 establishments in the Holy Roman Empire